Benjamin David Gillies (born 24 October 1979)  is an Australian musician, best known as the drummer of Australian rock band Silverchair from 1992 until the band went on hiatus in 2011. In 2003, Gillies formed Tambalane with Wes Carr, initially as a songwriting project; they released a self-titled album in 2005 and toured Australia but subsequently folded. By June 2011, after Silverchair's disbandment, Gillies was in the final stages of about 12 months of working on his solo album, and he said that it was not a continuation of his earlier work with Tambalane. In 2012, he formed Bento, in which he performs lead vocals, and released the band's debut album Diamond Days.

Career
Benjamin David Gillies was born on 24 October 1979 in Merewether, a suburb of Newcastle. He started as a quad drummer in the band The Marching Koalas, before forming a grunge group, Innocent Criminals, at the age of 12 with friends Daniel Johns and Chris Joannou. Playing originally at school and other venues in the Newcastle area, they came to attention after a weekend music workshop at the Tanilba Bay Progress Hall funded through the Arts Council of New South Wales in March 1994. By October 1994, under their new name Silverchair, their first EP Tomorrow had reached No. 1 on the ARIA Singles Chart. Silverchair went on to release five No. 1 albums, Frogstomp (1995), Freak Show (1997), Neon Ballroom (1999), Diorama (2002) and Young Modern (2007).

Gillies formed the band Tambalane in 2002 while Silverchair was in hiatus following Johns' illness, releasing a self-titled album featuring the singles "Little Miss Liar" and "Free" before the band folded in 2005. He then returned to work with Silverchair.

In May 2011, Silverchair announced an "indefinite hibernation" and that they were not likely to work together "in the foreseeable future". By June, Gillies was in the final stages of working on his solo album, he had been working on it for about 12 months and said that it was not a continuation of his earlier work with Tambalane.

In 2020, Gillies released the songs "Breathe In, Breathe Out" and "One Foot in Front of The Other".

In 2021, Gillies released the song "Yesteryear" which became a track on his five-song EP The Relative Relatives.

Personal life
In June 2010, Gillies married Jakica 'Jackie' Ivancevic. His wife, known as Jackie Gillies, works as a professional psychic and featured on the TV series The Real Housewives of Melbourne. 

In February 2018, Gillies was charged with mid-range drink driving.

In September 2020, Gillies was interviewed as a special guest on an episode of the Too Much of Not Enough Silverchair podcast, produced by Australian fan Daniel Hedger.

In October 2021, Gillies and his wife welcomed twin babies after multiple rounds of IVF.

Equipment
The following are some of the drumkits used by Gillies with Silverchair:

 Frogstomp/Freak Show/Neon Ballroom era:
Pearl Masters Custom Drums and Sabian Cymbals:
Pearl Drums — Black
6x14" Snare
12x14" Tom
16x16" Floor Tom
16x18" Floor Tom
16x24" Bass drum
19" AAX Metal Crash
20" AAX Metal Crash
21" AAX Metal Crash
21" AA Heavy Ride
14" AAX Metal Hi-Hats
Diorama era:
Le Soprano Drums and Sabian Cymbals:
Le Soprano Drums — Prima Original Ben Gillies Signature
14x6.5" Ben Gillies Signature Snare
13x8" Rack Tom
16x15" Floor Tom
18x15" Floor Tom
24x16" Bass Drum
14" HH Dark Hi-Hats
18" HH Dark Crash
21" HH Vintage Ride
20" Sabian Radia Crash
Young Modern era:
Le Soprano Drums and Sabian Cymbals:
Le Soprano Drums — Prima Original in Cherry Red
14x6.5" Ben Gillies Signature Snare
12x9" Rack Tom
13x08" Rack Tom
16x16" Floor Tom
18x16" Floor Tom
24x16" Bass Drum
14" HH Dark Hi-Hats
18" HH Dark Crash
21" HH Vintage Ride
20" HH Radia Crash (discontinued)
(Same as above, but with a 12x13" Tom next to his 9x12" Tom.)
Gillies also uses Pearl Hardware, Remo drum skins and Ben Gillies Heartbeater Vater sticks.
During the Neon Ballroom Tour he used 6 different drum sets.

References

1979 births
Living people
APRA Award winners
Australian rock drummers
Child rock musicians
Male drummers
People from Newcastle, New South Wales
Silverchair members
Australian multi-instrumentalists
21st-century drummers